Men's football tournament at 2004 South Asian Games was held across 3 venues in Pakistan from March 28 to April 6, 2004. The tournament was delayed twice due to conflicts between the Pakistani alliance with Afghanistan/Iraq and US foreign policy at the time during the events that followed 9/11.

The tournament was the first to introduce an under-23 tournament system for the football events. However, India entered with an under-20 team.

Group stage
Times listed are UTC+05:00.

Group A

Group B
Bhutan won a toss against Nepal for 2nd place.

Knockout stage

Semi finals

Bronze medal play-off

Gold medal match

Winner

Final ranking

References

External links
 RSSSF

2004 South Asian Games
2004 South Asian Games